Salin Monastery is a royal Buddhist monastery in Mandalay, Burma, known for its indigenous wooden carvings. The monastery was built under the patronage of the Salin Princess. Salin Monastery was located north of Mandalay Palace, near the racetrack.

See also
Atumashi Monastery
Shwenandaw Monastery
Myadaung Monastery
Taiktaw Monastery

Notes

References

 Tilly, Harry L.; Wood-carving of Burma; Rangoon 1903 (Gov. Pr., Burma), photographs P. Klier

Monasteries in Myanmar
Buddhist temples in Mandalay
19th-century Buddhist temples
Religious buildings and structures completed in 1859